Alexei Lvovich Efros is an American theoretical physicist who specializes in condensed matter physics. He is currently a Distinguished Professor at University of Utah.

Biography
Efros was born in 1938 in Leningrad, USSR. He received his Master of Science from Leningrad Polytechnic Institute in 1961, and his PhD from the Ioffe Physico-Technical Institute in 1962. Following graduation, he continued working at the Ioffe Institute and in the process received a second PhD in 1972 in semiconductor physics. In 1986, he received the Landau Prize in theoretical physics from the Soviet Academy of Sciences. In 1987 he was promoted to Principal Scientist at the Ioffe Institute and served as a professor in the Leningrad Electro-Technical Institute. During the dissolution of the Soviet Union in 1989 he emigrated to the United States and was a visiting distinguished scholar at University of California, Riverside. In 1991, he moved to the University of Utah and was promoted to Distinguished Professor in 1994. In 1992, he was elected a fellow of the American Physical Society "for his work on the theory of transport in disordered systems". In 1997, he received the Humboldt Prize.

In 2018, he received the 2019 Oliver E. Buckley Condensed Matter Physics Prize for "pioneering research in the physics of disordered materials and hopping conductivity" together with Elihu Abrahams and Boris I. Shklovskii.

Personal life
Efros's son, Alexei A. Efros is an associate professor of computer science at UC Berkeley.

References

1938 births
Living people
University of Utah faculty
21st-century American physicists
Theoretical physicists
Fellows of the American Physical Society
Humboldt Research Award recipients
Russian physicists
Scientists from Saint Petersburg
Saint Petersburg State Institute of Technology alumni
Oliver E. Buckley Condensed Matter Prize winners